Weslie Lesleon John (born 29 July 1991) is a Trinidadian professional football player. He represents Trinidad and Tobago national football team.

Career
Johnwas born to parents Carlene and Leslie John in Point Fortin, Trinidad. John's professional career began in 2010 at the age of 18, when he signed to W Connection in Trinidad and Tobago. At the beginning of the second season, he went on loan to fellow Pro League rivals Police F.C. where he spent two seasons. In July 2013, he transferred to newly promoted Point Fortin Civic F.C., his home town team. In January 2016, he signed to UES, helping the then last place team avoid relegation and retain their spot in the Salvadoran Primera División for the upcoming season and earned himself a selection to the "Best 11" team of the 2016 season.

His senior national team debut came in May 2016 when Trinidad and Tobago faced off against Peru for an international friendly. This was followed by another appearance against top-10 ranked Uruguay for another international friendly. John also represented Trinidad at youth level when he was a part of the 2011 Under 20 World Cup qualifying team.

References

External links

1991 births
Living people
Trinidad and Tobago footballers
Association football defenders
Trinidad and Tobago international footballers
Trinidad and Tobago expatriate footballers
Expatriate footballers in El Salvador
Expatriate footballers in Belarus
Expatriate footballers in Uzbekistan
Expatriate footballers in Latvia
W Connection F.C. players
Police F.C. (Trinidad and Tobago) players
Point Fortin Civic F.C. players
FC Isloch Minsk Raion players
FK Andijon players
FK Jelgava players